This is a list of fellows of the Royal Society elected in 1693.

Fellows 
Georg Franck-von- Franckenau  (1644–1704)
Thomas Kirke  (1650–1706)
John Henley  (1693–1706)
Robert Briggs  (1660–1718)
Charles Bodvill Robartes 2nd Earl of Radnor (1660–1723)
John Woodward  (1665–1728)
Thomas Willoughby 1st Baron Middleton (1670–1729)
Christopher Wren the Younger (1675–1747)

References

1693
1693 in science
1693 in England